Pals of the Range is a 1935 American Western film directed by Elmer Clifton, starring Rex Lease, Frances Morris, and Yakima Canutt.

Cast
 Rex Lease as Steve [Barton]
 Frances Morris (credited as Frances Wright) as Peggy
 Yakima Canutt as Brown
 George Chesebro as Zed
 Robert Whiteford as Joe
 Milburn Morante as Gold Dust
 Joey Ray as Tom
 Tom Forman as Uncle
 Artie Ortego as Rod
 Bill Patton as Stranger
 Art Mix as Dick

References

1935 films
1935 Western (genre) films
American black-and-white films
American Western (genre) films
Films directed by Elmer Clifton
1930s English-language films
1930s American films